Giovanni I (c. 1358 in Bologna – June 26, 1402 in Bologna) was the first ruler of Bologna from the Bentivoglio family, who rose to power among the faction-conflicts within the commune of Bologna. He ruled in 1401–02.

On March 14, 1401, he declared himself the ruler as signore and Gonfaloniere di Giustizia and secured his reign with the aid of the Visconti family. However, his reign did not last long and after the Visconti turned against him. He was killed in 1402 in the Battle of Casalecchio. He was later buried in the church of San Giacomo Maggiore. He was briefly succeeded by his son, Antongaleazzo, who was soon deposed. The next person to fully restore the power of the house was his grandson, Annibale I.

References

Bentivoglio, Giovanni 1
Bentivoglio, Giovanni 1
Bentivoglio, Giovanni 1
Giovanni 1
Year of birth unknown
Year of birth uncertain
14th-century Italian nobility
15th-century Italian nobility
Military personnel from Bologna
1358 births